Pseudochromis jace, the zippered dottyback, is a species of ray-finned fish from the Western Pacific Ocean around New Guinea Indonesia, which is a member of the family Pseudochromidae.

Etymology
The fish is named for the four children of Lisa and Michael Anderson, using the first letter of each of their names to create the species name.

References

jace
Taxa named by Gerald R. Allen
Taxa named by Anthony C. Gill
Taxa named by Mark van Nydeck Erdmann
Fish described in 2008